Morum finlayi is an extinct species of sea snail, a marine gastropod mollusk, in the family Harpidae.

References

finlayi
Gastropods described in 1932